The canton of Les Basses Plaines de l'Aude (before 2015: canton of Coursan) is an administrative unit in the Aude department, southern France. Its seat is in the town Coursan. The canton consists of 6 communes:
Armissan
Coursan
Cuxac-d'Aude
Fleury
Salles-d'Aude
Vinassan

References

Cantons of Aude